Acemya masurius is a species of bristle fly in the family Tachinidae.

References

Further reading

 
 

Tachinidae
Insects described in 1849